The Embraer Legacy 450/500 and Praetor 500/600 are a family of mid-size and super mid-size business jets built by Brazilian aircraft manufacturer Embraer. The aircraft family was launched with the Legacy 500 in April 2008 and were the first jets in the size category to feature a flat-floor stand-up cabin and fly-by-wire. 

The Praetor 500 and 600 are improvements of the Legacy 450 and 500, respectively, introduced in October 2018 offering more range.

Development

At the August 2007 National Business Aviation Association convention, Embraer unveiled a cabin mock-up of two concepts positioned between the $7 million Phenom 300 and the $26 million Legacy 600, called midsize jet (MSJ) and mid-light jet (MLJ), positioned on 22% of the market in units. The proposed aircraft share their flat floor, stand-up cabin but the MSJ should be 5 feet longer to accommodate 8 passengers over a 2,800-nmi range against 2,200-nmi for the smaller version.

The program was introduced in April 2008, Embraer planned to invest US$750 million and to introduce the larger model in 2012 and the smaller in 2013. Honeywell HTF7500E turbofans were selected along a Rockwell Collins Pro Line Fusion avionics suite integrated cockpit and a Parker Hannifin fly-by-wire flight control system.
At the May 2008 European Business Aviation Convention and Exhibition, the larger was named Legacy 500 and priced at $18.4 million and the smaller Legacy 450, priced at $15.25 million.
The variants have 95% systems commonality.

An assembly line was officially opened in Melbourne, Florida on 2 June 2016, adding Embraer Legacy 450 and 500 production to the existing Phenom 100 and 300 line, along a completion center/flight-prep building. The first Legacy 450 on the line since May 16 should be delivered in mid-December. The facility will be able to assemble up to 96 Phenoms and 72 Legacys annually.
The first Legacy 450 produced in Florida was delivered in December 2016; the fuselage is built in Botucatu in Brazil, and the wings in Évora, Portugal.
The first Legacy 500 entered final assembly in January 2017 and was flown in July.
Embraer will eventually move most of its Legacy 450/500 production in Florida but has not set up a schedule yet.

Praetor 500/600

Embraer introduced improved variants at the October 2018 NBAA convention, the Praetor 500 and 600, presented on display, with 3,250 nmi (6,019 km) and 3,900 nmi (7,223 km) of range; the 600 should be certified in the second quarter of 2019 and the 500 in the third quarter of 2019.
Both have  taller and wider winglets.
The $21 million Praetor 600 is based on the Legacy 500 with two tanks on the fuselage belly for  more fuel for a  capacity, and more powerful  HTF7500E engines.

Praetor 600 flight testing began on 31 March 2018 and 300h were logged with three aircraft by October 2018, while the Praetor 500 flight tests began on 13 September 2018 with 80h accumulated.
Within US SBAS zones, the synthetic vision guidance system (SVGS) allows autopilot-flown instrument approaches down to  height and  RVR without the optional Rockwell Collins EVS and HUD.

Previous Legacy 450s can be upgraded to the Praetor 500 configuration for $500,000.
For the higher thrust Praetor 600, Honeywell maintenance plans increases to $294 per engine per hour.
Active load alleviation deflects both ailerons upward at 2.0 Gs to prevent overstressing the wing without adding structural weight.

The Praetor 600 was certified by the National Civil Aviation Agency of Brazil by April 2019. Its range with four passengers and NBAA IFR reserves reached 4,018 nmi (7,441 km) from a 4,436 ft (1,352 m) take-off, and 3,719 nmi (6,887 km) at Mach 0.80.
European and US certification were secured by May.
The first delivery, to a European customer, happened on 28 June 2019.

This was followed by the EASA and FAA approval by the end of September.
On 23 December, the first was delivered to fractional operator Flexjet, two months after signing for 64 jets, including Praetor 500/600s and light Phenom 300Es.

In 2022, the equipped price of the Praetor 500 was $17.995M, and $21.495M for the 600.

Design

They are low wing, T-tail airplanes with cabin pressurization, powered by two rear mounted turbofans. The landing gear is fully retractable and designed to be operated on paved runways only. The glass cockpit includes four multi-function displays. The operation is made through a flight management system with autopilot, autothrottle and closed-loop control and monitoring of flight controls Fly-By-Wire. The aircraft are certified for Day, Night, VFR and IFR flights, and are approved for reduced vertical separation minima (RVSM) airspace and flight into known icing conditions, extended flight over water, Category II ILS, operations at high altitude airports up to 13800 ft and steep approach operations.

Embraer offers an enhanced flight vision system constituted by the Rockwell Collins HGS-3500 Head-up display combined with the EVS-3000 Infrared camera, permitting a decision altitude necessitating visual references of 100 ft above touchdown at a projected price of $515,000. Federal Aviation Administration's draft AC 20-167A further proposes a descent below 100 ft if the required visual references can be observed using the EFVS, similar to Cat II and III approaches with limited instrument landing systems in many small airports.

Variants

EMB-550 Legacy 500 

Embraer's timeline was delayed because software development for the fly-by-wire flight control system was running behind schedule. Supported by 800 engineers, the first Legacy 500 prototype (PT-ZEX) was rolled out on 23 December 2011 to begin ground testing and systems evaluation, prior to the aircraft’s first flight scheduled for the third quarter of 2012. The first engine run was completed on January 17, 2012.

The aircraft's first flight occurred on 27 November 2012, with certification and initial deliveries expected in early 2014. The first flight test crew was composed of the program Test Pilot Eduardo Camelier, Chief Test Pilot Mozart Louzada, Flight Test Director Alexandre Figueiredo and Flight Test Engineer Gustavo Paixao. The maiden flight was from Embraer headquarters at São José dos Campos Airport and all prototypes were flown to the Gaviao Peixoto Airport test facility after their first flight.

After 1,800 hours of flight tests and 20,000 hours of laboratory tests, its type certificate was received from National Civil Aviation Agency of Brazil (ANAC) on August 12, 2014, exceeding design goals. First delivery occurred to a Brazilian company on October 11, 2014. It received its Federal Aviation Administration (FAA) certification on October 21, 2014. Delivery of the 50th Legacy 500 is expected in the third quarter of 2016.

The aircraft fly-by-wire control enhances safety and comfort.
Climbing to its FL 430 initial cruise altitude takes 22 min and its 27° wing sweep allow a   average long-range cruise, Mach 0.76 - 0.78, while a Mach 0.80 cruise lowers the range by 3%.

The Legacy 500 competes with midsize jets like the $17.9 million Cessna Citation Sovereign+ and $23.4 million Cessna Citation X, but also with super-midsize $24 million Gulfstream G280 and $26 million Bombardier Challenger 350 and can be compared with the halted $21 million Learjet 85 program.
Bombardier discounts its Challenger 300/350 to match the Legacy 500's $20 million price, $7 million cheaper, while Gulfstream stays firm on its $24.5 million G280 price, as is Embraer, but the Legacy 500 loses 25% of its base value on the pre-owned market because of the glut of used super-midsize jets.

EMB-545 Legacy 450 

The Legacy 450 first flight occurred on December 28, 2013. It received its Brazilian certification on 11 August 2015, exceeding its design goals. It was certified by the FAA shortly after on 31 August 2015.
Embraer announced on 22 December 2015 its first delivery to LMG, LLC, an American provider of video, audio, and lighting support headquartered in Orlando.

It competes with the $16.25 million Cessna Citation Latitude and the $17.9 million Cessna Citation Sovereign. In July 2016, its certified range was extended to 2,904 nmi (5,378 km), 329 nmi (609 km) more than previously, and it is designed to carry 7 to 9 passengers.

Operational history

Near 70% of the 50+ Legacy 500s are in the U.S., mostly owned by Fortune 1000 private firms or wealthy individuals.
Toluca's Fly Across operates four Legacy 500s, as is Flexjet which plan to trade its five 450s to five 500s to become its largest operator. U.S. jet charter and management company Clay Lacy Aviation operates multiple Legacy-family business jets.  
The Legacy 500 average mission is less than 2 hours, and while fleet operators fly them more than 700 hours per year, single aircraft operators typically fly theirs 150–200 hours per year.

It burns  of fuel in the first hour, and then  at heavy weights down to  when lighter.
Maintenance per flight hour cost US$642 to US$658 for the two Honeywell HTF7500E depending on utilization, while airframe costs US$321 plus US$4,300 per month for low-utilization.
Dispatch reliability often exceeds 99% with most components mounted outside the pressure vessel for easy access if it breaks, except batteries and potable water servicing.

The EMB-550 Legacy 500 is known as Embraer IU-50 in the Brazilian Air Force, and used as radar calibration aircraft.

Specifications

See also

References

External links

 
 
 
 
 
 
 

Brazilian business aircraft
Embraer aircraft
Twinjets
T-tail aircraft
Low-wing aircraft
Aircraft first flown in 2012